Dimaitherium is an extinct hyracoid which existed in what is now Egypt, during the late Eocene period. It was first named by Eugenie Barrow, Erik R. Seiffert, and Elwyn L. Simons in 2010. The type species is Dimaitherium patnaiki.

References

Prehistoric hyraxes
Fossil taxa described in 2010
Eocene mammals
Eocene mammals of Africa
Prehistoric placental genera